Demetrida infuscata is a species of ground beetle in Lebiinae subfamily. It was described by Chaudoir in 1873 and is endemic to Australia.

References

Beetles described in 1873
Beetles of Australia
infuscata